Diachok is a historical name for a category of church worker in Ukrainian and Russian history.  They were laymen, not included into the official hierarchy of church offices.  Their duties included giving readings and leading the congregation in song during mass.  

During western immigration, people with the surname have also had it spelled "Dyachok."  The name essentially translates into "Cantor."

See also
Cantor
Reader (liturgy)

References

Obsolete occupations
Eastern Christian ecclesiastical offices
Russian Empire
Tsardom of Russia